Ləcət (also, Ledzhet) is a village and municipality in the Khachmaz Rayon of Azerbaijan.  It has a population of 2,637.  The municipality consists of the villages of Ləcət, Muruqoba, and Tağaroba.

References 

Populated places in Khachmaz District